Taplow United Football Club is a football club based in the village of Taplow, in the county of Buckinghamshire, England. They were founded in 1923 and offer football for boys and girls across all age groups from Under 7 to Under 18 plus 3 senior men's sides.

History

The football club was formed, by former pupils of Slough Secondary School in 1923 and were originally called Old Paludians.

In the 1994–95 season the club joined division one of the Chiltonian League. In 1998 the club then changed its name to Taplow United. In 2000 the Chiltonian league merged into the Hellenic Football League, but the club did not join the merged league and moved to the East Berkshire Football League instead. In the 2004–05 season the club moved to the Reading League.

Ground 
Taplow United play their home games at Stanley Jones Memorial Ground, Berry Hill, Taplow, Berkshire SL6 0DA. The club has played here since 1955, previously having played at Lascelles Road.

Honours
Slough Town Challenge Cup
Winners (1) 1994–95
Runners-up (1) 1995–96

References

External links
 Official website

Football clubs in Buckinghamshire
1923 establishments in England
Association football clubs established in 1923
Football clubs in England
Chiltonian League
East Berkshire Football League
Thames Valley Premier Football League
Hellenic Football League